The Deseadan age is a period of geologic time (29.0–21.0 Ma) within the Oligocene epoch of the Paleogene to the Early Miocene epoch of the Neogene, used more specifically within the SALMA classification of South America. It follows the Tinguirirican and precedes the Colhuehuapian age.

Etymology 
The age is named after the Deseado Formation of the Deseado Massif in eastern Patagonia, Argentina.

Formations

Fossils

Correlations 
The Deseadan South American land mammal age (SALMA) is equivalent to the Arikareean in the North American land mammal age (NALMA) and the Harrisonian in the 2000 version of the classification. It overlaps with the Hsandagolian of Asia and the MP 25 zone of Europe, the Waitakian and the Landon epoch of New Zealand.

References

Bibliography 
General
 

Deseado Formation
 
 

Abanico Formation
 
 
 
 
 
 

Agua de la Piedra Formation
 
 
 
 
 

Barzalosa Formation
 

Castillo Formation
 
 
 
 
 

Chambira Formation
 
 
 

Chilcatay Formation
 
 
 
 

Dos Bocas Formation
 
 

Fray Bentos Formation
 
 

Gaiman Formation
 
 

Lacayani fauna
 

Monte León Formation
 

Moquegua Formation
 
 

Mugrosa Formation
 

Petaca Formation
 

Río Baguales Formation
 

Salla Formation
 
 
 

Sarmiento Formation
 
 
 
 
 
 
 
 
 
 

Tremembé Formation
 
 
 

 
Oligocene geochronology
Oligocene South America
Paleogene Argentina